God's Gun (also known as Diamante Lobo) is a 1976 Italian-Israeli Spaghetti Western directed by Gianfranco Parolini (credited as Frank Kramer) and starring Lee Van Cleef, Jack Palance, Leif Garrett and Sybil Danning. Palance plays the head of a malicious group of bandits and Van Cleef plays a double-role of brothers: a priest and a reformed gunfighter. Leif Garrett plays the main character in the film as Johnny, a fatherless kid who brings the reformed gunfighter to town to avenge his brother's murder.

Synopsis 
One day Sam Clayton (Jack Palance) and his gang arrive in the small town of Juno City where Father John (Lee Van Cleef) is the priest of the local church. The gang wreak havoc in town, raping a woman and knifing a man in the back. They leave town, only to be caught by the fearless but unarmed Father John. After that, the gang member responsible for the murder is broken out of jail.

Vowing revenge, the gang ambushes and guns Father John down on the steps of his church, and then take over the town while waiting for the arrival of the next stagecoach. However, Johnny O'Hara (Leif Garrett), a local boy, manages to escape with a couple of their horses and rides off to Mexico in the hope of finding the priest's gunfighter twin brother (also Van Cleef). They meet and set off back across the border to clean up the town.

Meanwhile, Sam Clayton discovers that he is Johnny's father. Also, it is revealed that some fifteen years earlier, during the American Civil War, Jenny O'Hara (Sybil Danning) had been one of Clayton's victims, adding to the mystery of Johnny's paternity.

Cast 
Lee Van Cleef as Father John / Lewis
Jack Palance as Sam Clayton
Richard Boone as The Sheriff
Sybil Danning as Jenny
Leif Garrett as Johnny
Robert Lipton as Jess Clayton
Cody Palance as Zeke Clayton
Ian Sander as Red Clayton
Pnina Rosenblum as Chesty
Zila Carni as Juanita Lewis
Heinz Bernard as Judge Barrett
Didi Lukov as Rip
Ricardo David as Angel George
Chin Chin as Willy
Rafi Ben Ami as Mortimer

Production 
God's Gun was filmed in 1975 in Israel.

Richard Boone walked off the film before it was completed, leaving his role to be dubbed by another actor. In an interview with Cleveland Amory in Israel in May 1976, Boone told Amory: "I'm starring in the worst picture ever made. The producer is an Israeli and the director is Italian, and they don't speak. Fortunately it doesn't matter, because the director is deaf in both ears."

Home media

God's Gun was released on Blu-ray Disc in the Region A format by Kino Lorber on February 8, 2022.

A prior VHS release carried the title A Bullet from God.

References

External links 

 (English version)
 God's Gun – at the Troma Entertainment movie database

1975 films
Israeli drama films
Films shot in Israel
1975 Western (genre) films
1970s Italian-language films
Spaghetti Western films
Films directed by Gianfranco Parolini
English-language Israeli films
English-language Italian films
Golan-Globus films
Troma Entertainment films
Italian films about revenge
Italian vigilante films
1970s exploitation films
Films produced by Menahem Golan
Films about twin brothers
1970s Italian films